Percy Bentley (13 December 1906 − 25 March 1982) was an Australian rules footballer in the (then) Victorian Football League.

Bentley was a strong ruckman and great tactician who was a key player and coach for the Richmond Football Club during his era. He later coached Carlton Football Club during the 1940s and 1950s.

In 1996 Bentley was inducted into the Australian Football Hall of Fame.

Career highlights

Playing career
 Richmond 1925–1940 (Games: 263 Goals: 272)

Player honours
 Richmond captain 1932–1940
 Richmond premierships 1932, 1934 (captain-coach)
 Victorian representative 6 matches

Coaching record
 Richmond 1934–1940 (133 games, 86 wins, 46 losses, 1 draw), Premiership 1934
 Carlton 1941–1955 (281 games, 167 wins, 110 losses, 4 draws), Premierships 1945, 1947.

See also
 1927 Melbourne Carnival

Footnotes

References 
 
 Hogan P: The Tigers of Old, Richmond FC, Melbourne 1996

External links

 AFL Hall of Fame

1906 births
1982 deaths
Richmond Football Club players
Richmond Football Club Premiership players
Richmond Football Club coaches
Richmond Football Club Premiership coaches
Carlton Football Club coaches
Carlton Football Club Premiership coaches
Australian Football Hall of Fame inductees
Australian rules footballers from Victoria (Australia)
Castlemaine Football Club players
Two-time VFL/AFL Premiership players
Three-time VFL/AFL Premiership coaches